The Raigam Tele'es Best Teledrama Supporting Actress Award is presented annually in Sri Lanka by the Kingdom of Raigam associated with many commercial brands for the best Sri Lankan supporting actress of the year in television screen.

The award was first given in 2005. Following is a list of the winners of this prestigious title since then.

Award list in each year

References

Supporting Actress
Television awards for Best Supporting Actress